Sunghwa College was a college located in Gangjin, South Korea. It was shut down by the Korean government in 2011 following "serious corruption and irregularities".

External links
Sunghwa College

References

Gangjin County
Defunct universities and colleges in South Korea
Educational institutions established in 1997
Educational institutions disestablished in 2012
1997 establishments in South Korea